Desborough Island is a  manmade island in the River Thames on the reach above Sunbury Lock in Surrey, England. It was formed in the 1930s by the digging of a channel – the Desborough Cut – by the Thames Conservancy as a meander cutoff of narrow width on the right bank. The island and cut are named after Lord Desborough, a chairman of the Thames Conservancy.

Construction
The –mile (1–km) Desborough Cut takes the Thames directly between the brief Weybridge bank to the upper (south) part of the Walton bank — creating Desborough Island between it and the river meanders which front much of Old Shepperton and Lower Halliford in Shepperton. The meanders remain navigable. They are of similar width to the cut. The cut alleviated flooding at Hamm Court and in Shepperton and halves the distance of travel from its start to its finish.

Uses

The island is almost uninhabited: mainly open space, playing fields and water treatment facilities. The island has access over two bridges from Walton Lane; the upper bridge connects a green-buffer part of Weybridge, the other into a similar area of Walton-on-Thames. The parish boundaries are medieval. It is a site of nature conservation importance and is looked after by Elmbridge’s commons management team. The island contains the Walton Water Treatment Works, owned by Affinity Water, and has some sporting facilities. Other parts of its land are owned by the EA, Surrey County and Elmbridge Borough councils. Pleasure boats operate from Walton, making a trip round the island.

The late 2000s decade saw paths re-laid, seating added and hedges relaid to improve plant diversity and provide animal habitats.

In film, fiction and the media
The island and surrounding river stood in for the banks of the Mississippi in the 1983 video by Culture Club of its song "Karma Chameleon".

See also
Islands in the River Thames

References

Borough of Elmbridge
Islands of the River Thames
Parks and open spaces in Surrey